Jeremy Joseph Stevenson (born July 28, 1974) is an American-born Canadian former professional ice hockey left winger who last played for the Kalamazoo Wings of the International Hockey League.

Early life
Born in San Bernardino, California, Stevenson grew up in Elliot Lake, Ontario, where he played for the Elliot Lake Vikings of the Northern Ontario Junior Hockey League.

Career 
Stevenson was originally drafted in the third round, 60th overall by the Winnipeg Jets in the 1992 NHL Entry Draft.
He was later drafted in the 11th round, 262nd overall, by the Mighty Ducks of Anaheim in the 1994 NHL Entry Draft. He also played in the NHL for the Nashville Predators, Minnesota Wild and the Dallas Stars. Stevenson played a total of 207 regular season games, scoring 19 goals and assists for 28 points collecting 451 penalty minutes. He also played 21 playoff games, scoring five assists and collecting 20 penalty minutes. Stevenson then played for the Rødovre Mighty Bulls of the Danish Elite League before moving to Finland's SM-liiga with KalPa.

Career statistics

External links

1974 births
Amarillo Gorillas players
American men's ice hockey left wingers
Baltimore Bandits players
Canadian expatriate ice hockey players in Denmark
Canadian expatriate ice hockey players in Finland
Canadian ice hockey left wingers
Cincinnati Mighty Ducks players
Cornwall Royals (OHL) players
Dallas Stars players
Greensboro Monarchs players
Ice hockey players from California
Ice hockey people from Ontario
KalPa players
Living people
Anaheim Ducks draft picks
Mighty Ducks of Anaheim players
Milwaukee Admirals players
Milwaukee Admirals (IHL) players
Minnesota Wild players
Nashville Predators players
Newmarket Royals players
People from Elliot Lake
Rødovre Mighty Bulls players
Sault Ste. Marie Greyhounds players
South Carolina Stingrays players
Sportspeople from San Bernardino, California
Winnipeg Jets (1979–1996) draft picks